The knobbed hornbill (Rhyticeros cassidix), also known as Sulawesi wrinkled hornbill, is a colourful hornbill native to Indonesia. The species is sometimes placed in the genus Aceros. The knobbed hornbill is the faunal symbol of South Sulawesi province.

Description 
This is a large black hornbill with a yellow bill, white tail feathers, pale blue skin around eye, blackish feet and bare dark blue throat. The male has rufous/buff face and neck, orange-red eyes, and a high red casque on the top of his bill. The female has a black face and neck, a yellow casque, and brownish eyes.

Distribution and habitat 
An Indonesian endemic, the knobbed hornbill is found in Sulawesi, Buton, Lembeh, Togian and Muna Island. It inhabits evergreen forest at an elevation of up to 1,800 m and also makes use of secondary forest, woodland and plantations for foraging.

Ecology 
As with other hornbills, the knobbed hornbill is believed to be monogamous. Its diet consists mainly of fruits, but it will also take insects and small vertebrates. Breeding season spans 27–30 weeks and appears to be triggered by a dramatic reduction in rainfall. The female seals itself inside a tree hole for egg-laying using its own feces. During this time, the male will provide foods for the female and the young through a slit in the seal.

Knobbed hornbills are important seed dispersers in their habitat and influence the initial fate of seeds of several tropical forest tree species.

Conservation 
The species is currently classified as vulnerable by the IUCN. Despite being locally very common, they are threatened by habitat destruction from logging (since they depend on large and mature trees for breeding) and to some extent by hunting.

Gallery

References

knobbed hornbill
Endemic birds of Sulawesi
knobbed hornbill